PeaceHealth Sacred Heart Medical Center University District is a hospital in Eugene, Oregon, United States.  Originally called Sacred Heart Medical Center, its new name reflects its location near the University of Oregon and Northwest Christian University.   It is one of two Sacred Heart facilities in the Eugene-Springfield area owned by PeaceHealth.  The other facility, Sacred Heart Medical Center at RiverBend, is in Springfield.

Sacred Heart in Eugene had been the largest hospital in the area until the newer facility at RiverBend opened in August 2008.  Most general services moved to the larger hospital.  This facility became a specialty services hospital but retains an emergency department.  Other services that are still located here include the Oregon Rehabilitation Center, Behavioral Health Services, and the Gamma Knife Center.

History
Sacred Heart Medical Center in Eugene began as Pacific Christian Hospital, which was founded by Eugene Bible University, now Bushnell University and dedicated on March 16, 1924.  The building was six stories tall and cost about $225,000.  A School for Nurses was a part of the University and associated with the hospital.  By the 1930s, it was in bad shape structurally and financially.  At the same time, the Sisters of St. Joseph of Newark, which later became Sisters of St. Joseph of Peace, had a good reputation in the Pacific Northwest in hospital administration.  Due to this reputation, local physicians went to them for help in saving the hospital.  In 1936, the Sisters of St. Joseph bought it for $50,000 and changed its name to Sacred Heart General Hospital.

Expansions
The original building was expanded in 1941 with the addition of 100 beds. Another 100 bed expansion took place in 1951 bringing capacity to 262 beds. In 1965, the facility was expanded again to 366 beds total.  This last expansion included a new emergency room, a new maternity department, and a new intensive care department. The old Pacific Christian Hospital building was now gone. A 30-bed psychiatric unit was completed in 1969. In 1972, further additions were completed including a new ancillary building with new surgical units. In 1982, the hospital was again expanded along with adjacent physicians buildings.

In the early 2000s, the hospital needed to expand again but could not because of the surrounding buildings. Thus, PeaceHealth decided to build a new facility.  After much searching and discussions around the community, the new hospital was located in neighboring Springfield, Oregon in what is now known as the Riverbend area. In 2014, PeaceHealth completed a renovation of the University District facility and greatly expanded the Johnson Behavioral Health inpatient unit.

School of Nursing
The only nursing school outside of Portland, Oregon was started in 1942 by the hospital to meet wartime needs. In 1965, the three-year diploma program had 150 students. It was phased out in 1970 and transferred to the Lane Community College.

See also
List of hospitals in Oregon

References

Hospitals in Oregon
Buildings and structures in Eugene, Oregon